Henry Capell may refer to:

Henry Capell (MP for Boston) (died 1622), MP for Boston
Henry Capell (MP for Hertfordshire) (died 1588), MP for Hertfordshire
Henry Capell, 1st Baron Capell of Tewkesbury (1638–1696), MP for Tewkesbury, and for Cockermouth
Henry Capell (died 1558) (1505–1558), MP for Somerset